Seid Zukić (born 9 April 1994) is a Bosnian professional footballer who plays as a forward.

Professional career
Zukić scored 6 goals in 14 appearances for Orašje, and moved to Travnik in the second division of Bosnia. On 12 January 2018, Tours FC signed Zukić from the Bosnian club NK Vitez. Zukić made his professional debut with Tours in a 1-0 Ligue 2 loss to Stade de Reims on 16 January 2018.>

References

External links

Sport.de Profile

1994 births
Living people
People from Jablanica, Bosnia and Herzegovina
Bosnia and Herzegovina footballers
HNK Čapljina players
HNK Orašje players
NK Travnik players
NK Vitez players
Tours FC players
FK Sloboda Tuzla players
FK Radnik Bijeljina players
Ligue 2 players
Premier League of Bosnia and Herzegovina players
Association football forwards
Bosnia and Herzegovina expatriate footballers
Bosnia and Herzegovina expatriate sportspeople in France
Expatriate footballers in France